Ruddiman is a surname. Notable people with the surname include:

Thomas Ruddiman (1674–1757), Scottish classical scholar
Walter Ruddiman (1719–1781), Scottish printer, publisher, and newspaper proprietor
William Ruddiman, American paleoclimatologist